KRUFC may refer to:

Keighley RUFC
Kendal Rugby Union Football Club
Keyworth Rugby Union Football Club

See also

KRFC (disambiguation)